The 2017–18 National T20 Cup was a Twenty20 domestic cricket competition that was played in Pakistan. It was the fourteenth season of the National Twenty20 Cup in Pakistan. It was originally scheduled to take place in August and September 2017 with eight teams competing. However, in August 2017, it was announced that the tournament would be postponed until November 2017 because of the 2017 Independence Cup and Pakistan's series against Sri Lanka. All the matches were originally scheduled to be played at the Multan Cricket Stadium and the Iqbal Stadium. Following the revised dates to the competition, all the fixtures took place at the Rawalpindi Cricket Stadium.

The tournament started on 11 November and was scheduled to conclude on 26 November 2017. However, the semi-final fixtures were initially postponed by the Pakistan Cricket Board (PCB) by one day, following a protest by a religious party, which required more than 8,500 police and troops to remove the protesters. The next day, the PCB postponed the matches because of the "prevailing situation" and said they would announce new dates for the tournament at a later point. The PCB also confirmed that the Super Eight section of the 2017–18 Quaid-e-Azam Trophy would also be postponed until a later date too. On 27 November 2017 the PCB confirmed that the semi-finals and final would take place on 29 and 30 November 2017 respectively.

The defending champions, Karachi Blues, were not invited by the PCB to compete in this year's competition. Ahead of the tournament, the PCB recalled thirteen players who were playing in domestic competitions in England and in the 2017 Caribbean Premier League (CPL). However, shortly afterwards the PCB allowed players to return from the CPL and English domestic fixtures if they wished.

In the penultimate group-stage match, between Lahore Whites and Islamabad, batsmen Kamran Akmal and Salman Butt made an unbeaten opening stand of 209 runs. This was the highest opening partnership in Twenty20 cricket, beating the previous best of 207 runs set by Joe Denly and Daniel Bell-Drummond of Kent in the 2017 NatWest t20 Blast. Akmal became the first batsman for Pakistan to score 150 runs in a T20 match. He also hit the most number of sixes in a domestic T20 match in Pakistan and became the third batsman to make five consecutive fifties in T20 cricket.

Lahore Whites were the first side to qualify for the semi-finals, when they beat Peshawar by 27 runs on 21 November 2017. The next day, Lahore Blues also qualified for the semi-finals, with a five-wicket victory against Islamabad. In the penultimate round of group-stage fixtures, Faisalabad beat Peshawar by five wickets to advance to the semi-finals. In the final group-stage match, Federally Administered Tribal Areas beat Faisalabad by four wickets to progress to the semi-finals, having a superior net run rate than Karachi Whites, after both teams finished on seven points each.

In the semi-finals, Saeed Ajmal played in his final match of his 25-year-long career, playing for Faisalabad. In the first semi-final, Lahore Whites defeated Faisalabad by 10 runs. In the second semi-final, Lahore Blues defeated Federally Administered Tribal Areas, also by 10 runs, therefore ensuring an all-Lahore final. Lahore Blues went on to beat Lahore Whites by 7 wickets in the final.

Squads
Ahead of the tournament, the following players were selected:

Points table

 Team qualified for the Semi-finals

Fixtures

Round-robin

Knockout stage

Semi-finals

Final

References

External links
 Series home at ESPN Cricinfo

Pakistani cricket seasons from 2000–01
Domestic cricket competitions in 2017–18
2017 in Pakistani cricket
2017-18 National T20 Cup